Levi Rigters (born July 12, 1995) is a Dutch kickboxer currently signed with Glory, where he competes in the heavyweight division. He is a former Enfusion Heavyweight Champion and 2020 Glory 76 Heavyweight Tournament winner.

He is ranked as the tenth best heavyweight by Combat Press as of September 2022, and seventh best by Beyond Kick as of October 2022.

Kickboxing career

Enfusion
Rigters made his promotional debut with Enfusion in 2017 against Serkan Ozcaglayan. Rigters won the fight by a unanimous decision. During WFL: Manhoef vs. Bonjasky he fought Redouan Cairo. Rigters won the fight by a first round TKO. During Enfusion 63 Rigters defeated Bruno Susano by a second round TKO.

Rigters faced Martin Pacas for the Enfusion Super Heavyweight championship at Enfusion 73 on October 27, 2018. Rigters won the title by a unanimous decision.

Rigters continued his undefeated streak with non-title wins over Mihajlo Kecojevic at Enfusion 86, on June 28, 2019, and Dexter Suisse at Enfusion 88 on October 5, 2019.

Rigters made his first heavyweight title defense against Nidal Bchiri at Enfusion 79 on February 23, 2020. He won the fight by a unanimous decision.

Levi Rigters then entered the 2019 Abu Dhabi World Grand Prix, held at Enfusion 92 on December 6, 2019. He beat Giannis Stoforidis by unanimous decision in the tournament semifinals, and in the finals he defeated Martin Pacas by unanimous decision as well.

Glory
Rigters was scheduled to make his Glory debut at Glory 76 on December 12, 2020. He was to take part in a four-man heavyweight tournament, facing the #5 ranked heavyweight Antonio Plazibat in the semi finals. The tournament parings later changed, as Arkadiusz Wrzose pulled out of the tournament. Righters was rescheduled to face Jahfarr Wilnis. His opponent changed once more, with Wilnis being replaced by Massinissa Hamaili. The event was indefinitely postponed, as main event fighter Badr Hari contracted COVID-19, as well as due to a partial lockdown imposed by the Dutch government. The event was rescheduled for December 19. Hamaili would later be replaced by Marciano Bhagwandass, four days before the event. Rigters won the tournament, knocking out Marciano Bhagwandass with a body shot in the second round of the semifinal bout, and Nordine Mahieddine by a body kick in the first round of the tournament final.

Rigters took part in a four man heavyweight tournament at Glory 77 on January 30, 2021, facing Tarik Khbabez in the semifinals, as a late notice replacement for Antonio Plazibat. Despite coming into the fight as a favorite, Rigters would lose the fight by split decision.

Rigters was booked to fight the #10 ranked Glory heavyweight Tomáš Možný at Glory 78: Arnhem on September 4, 2021. He won the fight by a third-round technical knockout, stopping his opponent with low kicks.

Rigters was expected to face the two-time Glory heavyweight title challenger Jamal Ben Saddik at Glory 80 on March 19, 2022. The bout was cancelled minutes before starting, due to riots breaking out in the crowd. Rigters was next booked to face Tariq Osaro at Glory: Collision 4 on October 8, 2022. He won the fight by unanimous decision, with all five judges scoring the bout 29–28 in his favor.

Titles and accomplishments
RINGSLEAGUE
2016 RINGSLEAGUE Heavyweight Champion
Enfusion
Enfusion World Super Heavyweight Champion (One time; former)
One successful title defense
2019 Abu Dhabi World Grand Prix Champion

Glory
2020 Glory Heavyweight Tournament Winner

Kickboxing record

|- style="background:#cfc;"
| 2022-10-08 || Win || align="left" | Tariq Osaro || Glory: Collision 4 || Arnhem, Netherlands || Decision (Unanimous) || 3 || 3:00
|- style="background:#cfc;"
| 2021-09-04 || Win || align="left" | Tomáš Možný || Glory 78: Arnhem || Arnhem, Netherlands || TKO (Low kicks)  || 3 ||1:02
|-   bgcolor="#FFBBBB"
| 2021-01-30 || Loss ||align=left| Tarik Khbabez || Glory 77: Rotterdam Semi Final || Rotterdam, Netherlands || Decision (Majority) || 3 || 3:00
|- style="background:#cfc;"
| 2020-12-19 || Win ||align=left| Nordine Mahieddine || Glory 76: Rotterdam, Final  || Rotterdam, Netherlands || KO (Front kick)  || 1 || 1:49
|-
! style=background:white colspan=9 |
|- style="background:#cfc;"
| 2020-12-19 || Win ||align=left| Marciano Bhagwandass || Glory 76: Rotterdam, Semi Final  || Rotterdam, Netherlands || KO (Body punch) || 2 || 2:42
|- style="background:#cfc;"
| 2019-12-06 || Win ||align=left| Martin Pacas || Enfusion 92, Final  || Abu Dhabi, United Arab Emirates ||Decision (Unanimous) || 3 || 3:00 
|-
! style=background:white colspan=9 |
|- style="background:#cfc;"
| 2019-12-06 || Win ||align=left| Giannis Stoforidis || Enfusion 92, Semi Final  || Abu Dhabi, United Arab Emirates ||Decision (Unanimous) || 3 || 3:00
|- style="background:#cfc;"
| 2019-02-23 || Win ||align=left| Nidal Bchiri || Enfusion 79  || Eindhoven, Netherlands ||Decision (Unanimous) || 5 || 3:00
|-
! style=background:white colspan=9 |
|- style="background:#cfc;"
| 2019-10-05 || Win ||align=left| Dexter Suisse || Enfusion #88 || Dordrecht, Netherlands ||KO (Right hook) ||2 || 2:42
|- style="background:#cfc;"
| 2019-06-28 || Win ||align=left| Mihajlo Kecojevic || Enfusion #86  || Belgrade, Serbia ||Decision (Unanimous) ||3 || 3:00
|- style="background:#cfc;"
| 2018-10-27 || Win ||align=left| Martin Pacas || Enfusion 73  || Oberhausen, Germany ||Decision (Unanimous) || 5 || 3:00
|-
! style=background:white colspan=9 |
|- style="background:#cfc;"
| 2018-03-09 || Win ||align=left| Bruno Susano || Enfusion 63  || Abu Dhabi, United Arab Emirates ||KO (Knees and Punches)|| 2 ||
|- style="background:#cfc;"
| 2017-10-29 || Win ||align=left| Redouan Cairo || WFL: Manhoef vs. Bonjasky, Final 16  || Almere, Netherlands || TKO (3 Knockdowns Rule) || 1 || 1:55
|- style="background:#cfc;"
| 2017-04-29 || Win ||align=left| Serkan Ozcaglayan|| Enfusion Live x Fightsense  || Zoetermeer, Netherlands ||Decision (Unanimous) || 3 || 3:00 

|- style="background:#cfc;"
| 2016-11-20 || Win ||align=left| Semmie Onojaife|| Rings Fighting Network, Final  || Aalsmeer, Netherlands ||KO (Punches)|| 4 ||  
|-
! style=background:white colspan=9 |
|- style="background:#cfc;"
| 2016-11-19 || Win ||align=left| Perry Reichling || Rings Fighting Network, Semi Final  || Aalsmeer, Netherlands ||Decision|| 3 || 3:00
|- style="background:#cfc;"
| 2016-10-01 || Win ||align=left|  || Rings Fighting Network, Quarter Final  ||  Netherlands ||TKO|| 1 ||
|- style="background:#cfc;"
| 2016-05-16 || Win ||align=left| Arthur King || Fightclub Den Haag  ||  Den Haag, Netherlands ||TKO (Ref. stoppage) || 1 ||
|- style="background:#cfc;"
| 2016-04-30 || Win ||align=left| Fatih Cimic||  Öncü Fight Club ||  Istanbul, Turkey ||KO || 2 ||
|- style="background:#cfc;"
| 2016-02-28 || Win ||align=left| Cihad Kepenek ||  Anadolu Arena 9 || Tokat, Turkey ||Decision || 3 || 3:00
|- style="background:#cfc;"
| 2015-12-06 || Win ||align=left| Abderrahman Barkouch|| Real Fighters  ||  Netherlands ||Decision || 3 || 3:00
|-
| colspan=9 | Legend:    

|- style="background:#cfc;"
| 2015-10-17 || Win ||align=left| ||   ||  Netherlands ||Decision || 3 || 3:00
|- style="background:#cfc;"
| 2015-09-26 || Win ||align=left| ||  Back to the Old School || Amsterdam, Netherlands ||Decision || 3 || 3:00
|- style="background:#FFBBBB;"
| 2015-07 || Loss ||align=left| Roel Mannaart ||  Ultimate Kickboxing || Hoogeveen, Netherlands ||Decision || 3 || 3:00
|- style="background:#cfc;"
| 2015-05 || Win ||align=left| ||  Fightclub Den Haag ||  Netherlands ||KO ||  ||
|-
|- style="background:#cfc;"
| 2014-11-01 || Win ||align=left| Mick Thijn ||  Tiende Bari Gym Kickboksgala Noordwijkerhout || Noordwijkerhout, Netherlands || TKO (Referee stoppage) || 1 ||
|-
| colspan=9 | Legend:

See also 
List of male kickboxers

References

Living people
1995 births
Heavyweight kickboxers
Dutch male kickboxers
Dutch sportspeople of Surinamese descent